Susan's Gentleman is a lost 1917 silent film feature drama directed by Edwin Stevens, a stage actor who made a foray into silent films, and starred Violet Mersereau.  It was produced by Bluebird Photoplays and released through the Universal Film Manufacturing Company. This film has an appearance by James O'Neill, famed for The Count of Monte Cristo, here making a rare screen appearance.

Cast
Violet Mersereau - Nancy Croyden/Susan Flynn
Maud Cooling - Ora Tourette
James O'Neill - Sir Jeffrey Croyden
William O'Neill - Sir Bevis Neville
Bradley Barker - Terrence Flynn
Sidney Mason - Tom Neville (*as billed Sydney Mason)

References

External links
 Susan's Gentleman at IMDb.com

1917 films
American silent feature films
Lost American films
Universal Pictures films
American black-and-white films
Silent American drama films
1917 drama films
1917 lost films
Lost drama films
1910s American films